Sylvia Lindgren, born 1945, is a Swedish social democratic politician who has been a member of the Riksdag from 1992 to 2010.

References

External links
Sylvia Lindgren at the Riksdag website

1945 births
Living people
Members of the Riksdag from the Social Democrats
Women members of the Riksdag
Members of the Riksdag 2002–2006
21st-century Swedish women politicians
Members of the Riksdag 1991–1994
Members of the Riksdag 1994–1998
Members of the Riksdag 1998–2002
Members of the Riksdag 2006–2010